Events from the year 1843 in Scotland.

Incumbents

Law officers 
 Lord Advocate – Duncan McNeill
 Solicitor General for Scotland – Adam Anderson

Judiciary 
 Lord President of the Court of Session and Lord Justice General – Lord Boyle
 Lord Justice Clerk – Lord Hope

Events 
 18 May – the Disruption of the Church of Scotland takes place.
 3 June – first burial in Warriston Cemetery, Edinburgh.
 29 June – Robert Napier launches his first iron ship, the paddle steamer Vanguard, from his new yard at Govan on the River Clyde.
 1 July – Union Bank of Scotland opens in Glasgow.
 13 August – Sir William Dunbar, priest of St. Paul's Chapel, Aberdeen, is excommunicated from the Scottish Episcopal Church for refusing to administer or receive the sacrament in accordance with the church's ritual.
 Dingwall becomes the county town of Ross and Cromarty.
 The last laird of Raasay, John Macleod, emigrates to Tasmania having sold the Scottish island to George Rainy to help clear his debts.
 The Ordnance Survey commences its first published mapping of Scotland with a survey of Wigtownshire.
 The Glenmorangie distillery is established in Tain by William Matheson.
 Glenburn Hydro is opened in Rothesay, Bute, the first hydropathic establishment in Scotland.
 First paddle steamer on Loch Katrine, Gypsy.
 Little Ross lighthouse completed.
 Angus MacKay becomes first Piper to the Sovereign.
 Marion Kirkland Reid's feminist tract A Plea for Woman is published in Edinburgh.

Births 
 12 June – David Gill, astronomer known for measuring astronomical distances, for astrophotography, and for geodesy (died 1914)
 5 August – James Scott Skinner, dancing master, fiddler and composer (died 1927)
 21 August – Thomas Hill Jamieson, librarian (died 1876)

Deaths 
 25 July – Charles Macintosh, chemist and inventor of waterproof fabrics after whom the Mackintosh raincoat is named (born 1766)
 5 December – David Hamilton, architect (born 1768)

The arts
 Hill & Adamson form Scotland's first photographic studio, on Calton Hill in Edinburgh.

See also 

 Timeline of Scottish history
 1843 in the United Kingdom

References 

 
Scotland
1840s in Scotland